The 2009 WNBA season is the 11th season for the Minnesota Lynx of the Women's National Basketball Association.

Offseason

Dispersal Draft
Based on the Lynx's 2008 record, they would pick 4th in the Houston Comets dispersal draft. The Lynx picked Roneeka Hodges.

WNBA Draft
The following are the Lynx's selections in the 2009 WNBA Draft.

Transactions
July 17: The Lynx signed Tasha Humphrey and waived Christi Thomas.
June 5: The Lynx waived Tye'sha Fluker, Emily Fox, and Anna DeForge.
June 3: The Lynx promoted Jennifer Gillom as head coach to replace Don Zierden
June 1: The Lynx signed Tye'sha Fluker.
May 30: The Lynx waived Kamersha Hairston and Aisha Mohammed.
May 11: The Lynx signed Kamesha Hairston and Aisha Mohammed to training camp contracts.
May 7: The Lynx signed Roneeka Hodges and renounced the rights to Kristi Harrower.
May 5: The Lynx traded Noelle Quinn to the Los Angeles Sparks in exchange for Rafaella Masciadri and a first-round 2010 WNBA Draft pick.
April 22: The Lynx waived Navonda Moore.
January 30: The Lynx traded Lindsey Harding, their second-round draft picks in 2009 (23rd overall) and 2010 to the Washington Mystics for their first-round (ninth overall) and second round (15th overall) draft picks in the 2009 draft.
January 30: The Lynx traded Nicole Ohlde to the Phoenix Mercury for Kelly Miller and LaToya Pringle.
January 30: The Lynx signed-and-traded Vanessa Hayden to the Los Angeles Sparks for Christi Thomas.
January 9: The Lynx waived Kristen Rasmussen.
March 14, 2008: The Lynx swapped second-round 2009 Draft picks with the Connecticut Sun as part of the Kristen Rasmussen/Tamika Raymond transaction.

Free agents

Additions

Subtractions

Roster

Season standings

Schedule

Preseason

|- align="center" bgcolor="ffbbbb"
| 1 || May 23 || 1:00pm || Indiana || 51-68 || Hollingsworth (14) || Pringle (6) || Montgomery (3) || College of St. Benedict  475 || 0-1
|-

Regular season

|- align="center" bgcolor="bbffbb"
| 1 || June 6 || 8:00pm || Chicago || NBA TVFSN-N || 102-85 || Augustus (23) || Anosike, Houston (5) || Anosike (8) || Target Center  8,708 || 1-0
|- align="center" bgcolor="bbffbb"
| 2 || June 7 || 7:00pm || @ Indiana || FSI || 96-74 || Houston (23) || Anosike, Augustus, Houston (5) || Houston (4) || Conseco Fieldhouse  9,234 || 2-0
|- align="center" bgcolor="bbffbb"
| 3 || June 10 || 8:00pm || Los Angeles ||  || 87-76 || Augustus (30)  || Augustus (9) || Anosike, Miller (5)  || Target Center  7,444 || 3-0
|- align="center" bgcolor="ffbbbb"
| 4 || June 12 || 8:00pm || Seattle ||  || 71-88 || Houston (18) || Anosike (7) || Augustus, Montgomery (3) || Target Center  6,423 || 3-1
|- align="center" bgcolor="bbffbb"
| 5 || June 16 || 10:00pm || @ Sacramento ||  || 86-83 || Augustus (30) || Anosike, Wiggins, Hollingsworth (5) || Wiggins (6) || ARCO Arena  7,736 || 4-1
|- align="center" bgcolor="ffbbbb"
| 6 || June 17 || 10:00pm || @ Phoenix ||  || 80-104 || Anosike, Houston (21) || Anosike (10) || McCants (4) || US Airways Center  6,524 || 4-2
|- align="center" bgcolor="ffbbbb"
| 7 || June 19 || 10:00pm || @ Seattle ||  || 62-90 || Wiggins (12) || Anosike (7) || Houston, Wiggins (2) || KeyArena  7,607 || 4-3
|- align="center" bgcolor="bbffbb"
| 8 || June 23 || 8:00pm || New York ||  || 69-57 || Wiggins (25) || Hollingsworth (7) || Wiggins (5) || Target Center  5,620 || 5-3
|- align="center" bgcolor="bbffbb"
| 9 || June 27 || 8:00pm || Phoenix || NBA TVFSN-N || 109-80 || Hodges, Wiggins (22) || Anosike (8) || Miller (8) || Target Center  5,911 || 6-3
|- align="center" bgcolor="bbffbb"
| 10 || June 30 || 7:00pm || @ Atlanta || ESPN2 || 91-85 || Wiggins (23) || Anosike (12) || Anosike, Houston, Wiggins (4) || Philips Arena  7,686 || 7-3
|-

|- align="center" bgcolor="ffbbbb"
| 11 || July 2 || 8:00pm || Sacramento || NBA TVFSN-N || 68-74 || Hodges (15) || Anosike (8) || Anosike (7) || Target Center  6,920 || 7-4
|- align="center" bgcolor="bbffbb"
| 12 || July 7 || 8:00pm || Washington ||  || 96-94 (OT) || Anosike (24) || Houston (8) || Anosike, Miller (4) || Target Center  7,171 || 8-4
|- align="center" bgcolor="ffbbbb"
| 13 || July 10 || 8:00pm || San Antonio ||  || 61-77 || Wiggins (15) || Anosike (12) || Hodges, Miller (2) || Target Center  7,409 || 8-5
|- align="center" bgcolor="bbffbb"
| 14 || July 12 || 7:00pm || @ San Antonio || NBA TVKMYS || 83-76 || Houston (26) || Anosike, Houston (8) || Anosike, Wiggins (4) || AT&T Center  6,568 || 9-5
|- align="center" bgcolor="ffbbbb"
| 15 || July 15 || 1:00pm || Atlanta || NBA TVFSN-N || 77-91 || Anosike (22) || Houston (12) || Montgomery (7) || Target Center  11,245 || 9-6
|- align="center" bgcolor="ffbbbb"
| 16 || July 19 || 8:00pm || @ Seattle || NBA TVFSN-NW || 69-72 || Anosike, Hodges, Wiggins (12) || Anosike (11) || McCants (3) || KeyArena  6,912 || 9-7
|- align="center" bgcolor="bbffbb"
| 17 || July 23 || 10:00pm || @ Phoenix ||  || 99-86 || Anosike (21) || Houston (9) || Anosike (5) || US Airways Center  7,360 || 10-7
|- align="center" bgcolor="ffbbbb"
| 18 || July 27 || 8:00pm || Los Angeles ||  || 70-76 || Hodges (14) || Anosike (6) || Hodges (4) || Target Center  7,216 || 10-8
|- align="center" bgcolor="ffbbbb"
| 19 || July 30 || 7:30pm || @ Detroit ||  || 83-91 || Houston, McCants (14) || Anosike, Hollingsworth, Houston (5) || Hodges, Kelly Miller, Montanana || Palace of Auburn Hills  9,314 || 10-9
|-

|- align="center" bgcolor="ffbbbb"
| 20 || August 1 || 8:00pm || Phoenix ||  || 74-87 || Hollingsworth (17) || Anosike (10) || Anosike (5) || Target Center  6,631 || 10-10
|- align="center" bgcolor="bbffbb"
| 21 || August 7 || 8:00pm || Connecticut || NBA TVFSN-N || 95-88 || Montgomery (24) || Anosike (12) || Montgomery, Wiggins (3) || Target Center  8,134 || 11-10
|- align="center" bgcolor="ffbbbb"
| 22 || August 9 || 6:00pm || San Antonio ||  || 87-89 || Anosike (24) || Hodges, Hollingsworth (8) || Wiggins (4) || Target Center  7,764 || 11-11
|- align="center" bgcolor="ffbbbb"
| 23 || August 13 || 8:00pm || Indiana ||  || 81-91 || Wiggins (23) || Anosike (16) || Hodges (3) || Target Center  7,156 || 11-12
|- align="center" bgcolor="ffbbbb"
| 24 || August 15 || 8:00pm || @ Chicago ||  || 76-79 || Hodges (25) || Anosike, Hodges (8) || Hodges, Wiggins (6) || UIC Pavilion  3,877 || 11-13
|- align="center" bgcolor="ffbbbb"
| 25 || August 19 || 10:30pm|| @ Los Angeles ||  || 63-78 || Montgomery (16) || McCants (8) || Montgomery (4) || STAPLES Center  9,181 || 11-14
|- align="center" bgcolor="ffbbbb"
| 26 || August 22 || 7:00pm || @ Connecticut ||  || 94-98 || Humphrey, Wiggins (21) || Humphrey (7) || Hodges, Montgomery (4) || Mohegan Sun Arena  7,803 || 11-15
|- align="center" bgcolor="ffbbbb"
| 27 || August 23 || 4:00pm || @ New York ||  || 67-80 || Anosike (18) || Wiggins (7) || 5 players (2) || Madison Square Garden  8,481 || 11-16
|- align="center" bgcolor="bbffbb"
| 28 || August 28 || 8:00pm || Sacramento ||  || 100-95 || Miller (18) || Anosike (6) || Anosike (5) || Target Center  8,782 || 12-16
|- align="center" bgcolor="ffbbbb"
| 29 || August 30 || 4:00pm || @ Washington ||  || 75-81 || Houston (20) || Anosike (6) || Wiggins (4) || Verizon Center  12,241 || 12-17
|-

|- align="center" bgcolor="ffbbbb"
| 30 || September 1 || 8:00pm || @ San Antonio ||  || 82-84 (2OT) || Wiggins (19) || Anosike (11) || Anosike (3) || AT&T Center  4,881 || 12-18
|- align="center" bgcolor="bbffbb"
| 31 || September 5 || 8:00pm || Seattle || NBA TVFSN-N || 76-68 || Houston (22) || Humphrey (7) || Houston (4) || Target Center  8,170 || 13-18
|- align="center" bgcolor="bbffbb"
| 32 || September 9 || 8:00pm || Detroit ||  || 75-72 || McCants, Montanana, Montgomery (12) || McCants (6) || Montanana, Wiggins (3) || Target Center  7,423 || 14-18
|- align="center" bgcolor="ffbbbb"
| 33 || September 11 || 10:30pm || @ Los Angeles  || NBA TVFSNW || 61-90 || Wiggins (15) || Houston (8) || Miller, Montgomery, Wiggins (3) || STAPLES Center  13,764 || 14-19
|- align="center" bgcolor="ffbbbb"
| 34 || September 13 || 9:00pm || @ Sacramento ||  || 66-88 || Houston (18) || Hollingsworth (9) || Montgomery (5) || ARCO Arena  10,212 || 14-20
|-

| All games are viewable on WNBA LiveAccess

Regular Season Statistics

Player Statistics

Team Statistics

Awards and honors
Seimone Augustus was named WNBA Western Conference Player of the Week for the week of June 15, 2009.
Candice Wiggins was named WNBA Western Conference Player of the Week for the week of June 29, 2009.
Nicky Anosike was named to the 2009 WNBA All-Star Team as a Western Conference reserve.
Charde Houston was named to the 2009 WNBA All-Star Team as a Western Conference reserve.
Renee Montgomery was named to the All-Rookie Team.
Nicky Anosike was named to the All-Defensive First Team.

References

External links
Gillom promoted to head coach of the Minnesota Lynx

Minnesota Lynx seasons
Minnesota
Minnesota Lynx